The George Herbert Jones Laboratory is an academic building at 5747 S. Ellis Avenue, Chicago, Illinois, on the main campus of the University of Chicago.  Room 405 of the building was named a National Historic Landmark in 1967; it was the site where plutonium, the first man-made element, was isolated and measured.

Description and history
The George Herbert Jones Laboratory is located at the northwest corner of the main quadrangle of the University of Chicago campus, between East 58th and 57th Streets. It is a four-story masonry structure, built in 1928-29 as facility and instructional space for the university's staff of research chemists and graduate students in chemistry. It is accessed via a wooden door with a glass window in its upper half.

As part of the U.S. War Department's Manhattan Project, University of Chicago chemists began to study the newly manufactured radioactive element, plutonium.  Room 405 was the site where, for the first time on August 18, 1942, a team led by physicist Glenn Seaborg isolated a trace quantity of this new element.  Measurements, performed on September 10, 1942, enabled chemists to determine the new element's atomic weight.  This important step was to change the world, making possible both nuclear power and nuclear weapons.  Seaborg later said of this event: "These memorable days will go down in scientific history to mark the first sight of a synthetic element, and the first isolation of a weighable amount of an artificially produced isotope of any element."

The U.S. Department of Energy remediated Jones Laboratory in the 1980s by studying and removing almost all of the building's World War II-era radioactive waste.  The remediation took place in 1982, 1983, and 1987.

Although room 405 looks nothing like the original condition, the lobby of the laboratory maintains a collection of the specialized equipment used to perform the measurements.  Although the building's basement and ground floor were significantly damaged by an explosion in 1973, Room 405 was not affected.

References

School buildings completed in 1929
Jones, George Herbert
George Herbert Jones Laboratory
National Historic Landmarks in Chicago
1929 establishments in Illinois